Walkerton is an unincorporated community in King and Queen County, Virginia, United States.

Fort Mattapony, Hillsborough, and Northbank are listed on the National Register of Historic Places.

Climate
The climate in this area is characterized by hot, humid summers and generally mild to cool winters.  According to the Köppen Climate Classification system, Walkerton has a humid subtropical climate, abbreviated "Cfa" on climate maps.

References

Unincorporated communities in Virginia
Unincorporated communities in King and Queen County, Virginia